Maria Teresa Recio (born 7 July 1963 in Villares de la Reina) is a retired Spanish long-distance runner who specialized in the 10,000 metres and cross-country running. She competed in the women's 10,000 metres at the 2000 Summer Olympics.

Achievements

Personal bests
1500 metres - 4:18.83 min (1996)
3000 metres - 9:00.72 min (1998)
5000 metres - 15:12.06 min (2000)
10,000 metres - 31:43.80 min (1999)
Half marathon - 1:13:42 hrs (2003)

References

External links
 

1963 births
Living people
Spanish female long-distance runners
Athletes (track and field) at the 2000 Summer Olympics
Olympic athletes of Spain